Dreamus is an electronics and entertainment company founded in 1999 originally as ReignCom. Currently headquartered in South Korea (and formerly in the United States), it is the parent company of South Korean-based iRiver, Astell & Kern and FLO, as well as Yurion and Funcake Entertainment Services. Since 2014, it has been a subsidiary of SK Telecom when it was formerly known as iRiver.

History 
Seven former Samsung executives created the company in 1999 and made its IPO on the KOSDAQ, a Korean stock exchange, in 2003. Duk-Jun Yang, one of the founders, became the CEO of the company.

ReignCom announced in May 2006 that it would adjust its focus toward handheld mobile gaming. It has reported sluggish sales for its music player business, including a loss of 35.58 billion (US$36.68 million) in 2005, compared with a net profit of 43.46 billion in 2004.

In 2009, ReignCom was renamed as iRiver.

In August 2014, SK Telecom acquired iRiver for 30 billion won.

Entry into music 
In January 2015, music streaming platform Music Mate was launched.

On July 17, 2017 SM Entertainment acquired a stake in iRiver and became the second largest shareholder.

On January 31, 2018, it was announced that, parent company SK Telecom along with entertainment agencies SM Entertainment, JYP Entertainment, and Hybe Corporation (formerly known as Bighit Entertainment) would collaborate and launch a B2B music distribution and a B2C music service platform. As part of this agreement, beginning from February 1, iRiver would distribute JYP and Big Hit’s album and digital music contents. HYBE would later go on to strike a distribution deal with YG Plus in January 27, 2021 hence no longer partnering with Dreamus.

On December 11, 2018 it was announced that the company will update and rename the existing music streaming service 'Music Mate' to the new music platform 'FLO'.

On March 28, 2019, iRiver announced that they would renamed to Dreamus Company.

On November 18, 2021 Dreamus partnered with entertainment agency RBW and FLO and signed an exclusive performance partnership contract, with this Dreamus owns a 2.04% stake in RBW.

On November 29, 2021 SK Telecom, originally Dreamus' parent company, created and spun off SK Square, with Dreamus becoming a subsidiary of SK Square.

Distributed labels

Current 
South Korea
As of March 2022:
 SM Entertainment
 Label SJ
 Million Market
 Mystic Story (select releases only; co-distributed with Kakao Entertainment)
 Woollim Entertainment (select releases only; co-distributed with Kakao Entertainment)
 JYP Entertainment
 Studio J
 SQU4D
 P Nation (co-distributed with Kakao Entertainment, Genie Music and Stone Music Entertainment)
 NUPLAY
 Blue Vinyl
 Biscuit Entertainment
 143 Entertainment
 KQ Entertainment
 Wake One Entertainment
 IOK Music
 131 Label
 Moss Music

International
 Avex Inc.
 Johnny & Associates
 J Storm
 SM Entertainment
 Label V

Former 
 Hybe Corporation (moved to YG Plus)
 Big Hit Music
 Pledis Entertainment

Notes

References

External links

 
Electronics companies of South Korea
Entertainment companies of South Korea
South Korean record labels
SK Group subsidiaries